Léopold Clément, Hereditary Prince of Lorraine (Léopold Clément Charles; 25 April 1707 – 4 June 1723) was heir apparent to the throne of the sovereign Duchy of Lorraine.

His father was the reigning Duke of Lorraine and his mother a member of the House of Bourbon, then ruling the Kingdom of France. He became the Hereditary Prince at the death of his older brother Louis in 1711, but died of smallpox in 1723 at the age of sixteen, unmarried and without descendants.

Biography

He was born at the Château de Lunéville to Léopold, Duke of Lorraine and his wife Élisabeth Charlotte d'Orléans.

Léopold was the third son born to his parents.  His eldest brother, also Léopold (1699–1700), died aged eight months.  Three other older siblings died in an outbreak of smallpox at Lunéville: Élisabeth Charlotte (1700–1711), Marie Gabrièle Charlotte (1702–1711) and Louis (1704–1711). The smallpox epidemic had killed other royalty such as the Grand Dauphin and the Holy Roman Emperor Joseph I at the same time.

In 1722 Léopold also became the heir to the Duchy of Teschen which was given to his father in compensation for his father's maternal grandmother's rights to the Duchy of Montferrat in northern Italy, which Emperor Charles VI had taken and given to his allies, the Dukes of Savoy.

In 1723 he was sent to Vienna to carry out his education under the supervision of Charles VI, his father's first cousin. Another reason for his journey was to forge a Habsburg-Lorraine alliance through a marriage with the Archduchess Maria Theresa.

Soon afterward the prince caught smallpox at Lunéville and quickly died at the Château there. He was buried in the Ducal Crypt at the Church of Saint-François-des-Cordeliers, Nancy. His younger brother Francis Stephen became the Hereditary Prince and later married Maria Theresa, Habsburg heiress and future Queen regnant of Hungary and Bohemia.

Ancestry

References and notes

House of Lorraine
1707 births
1723 deaths
Heirs apparent who never acceded
Deaths from smallpox
18th-century French people
People from Lunéville
Hereditary Princes of Lorraine
Knights of the Golden Fleece of Austria
Royalty and nobility who died as children